Ceasefires in Myanmar have been heavily utilized by the Burmese government as a policy to contain ethnic rebel groups and create tentative truces. The first ceasefire was arranged by the State Law and Order Restoration Council in 1989, specifically spearheaded by Khin Nyunt, then the Chief of Military Intelligence, with the Kokang-led National Democratic Alliance Army, which had recently split from the Communist Party of Burma due to internal conflicts.

Background

The internal conflict in Myanmar began after the country's independence in 1948, as successive central governments of Myanmar (or Burma) fought myriad ethnic and political rebellions. Some of the earliest insurgencies were by Burmese-dominated "multi-colored" leftists, and by the Karen National Union (KNU). The KNU fought to carve out an independent Karen state from large swaths of Lower Myanmar. Other ethnic rebellions broke out in the early 1960s after the central government refused to consider a federal style government. By the early 1980s, politically oriented armed insurgencies had largely withered away, but ethnic-based insurgencies remained active during the conflict.

In the 1980s, rebel groups controlled most of the country's periphery. The two major organisations fighting against the Burma Socialist Programme Party-led government, were two umbrella groups, the pro-Chinese Communist Party of Burma (allied to local Kokang Chinese, Wa and Shan groups), based along the Chinese-Burmese border; and the pro-West National Democratic Force (made up of ethnic Mon, Karen, Karenni and Shan opposition groups), based along the Thai-Burmese border.

By the late 1980s, the Communist Party of Burma (CPB) had weakened considerably, because of waning Chinese financial support and internal strife. During the 1988 Uprising, the CPB failed to seize the opportunity to invoke political change. A month later, the State Law and Order Restoration Council (SLORC), a council of military men, staged a coup d'etat. Consequently, ethnic Wa and Kokang armed forces led a mutiny against CPB, forming the United Wa State Party (UWSP) and the National Democratic Alliance Army (NDAA) respectively. SLORC used this opportunity to arrange ceasefires with the armed rebel groups that had just mutinied, under a policy designed by Khin Nyunt, who was then the Chief of Military Intelligence. The deal fell short of its nationwide billing, with seven of the fifteen armed groups invited declining to sign because of disagreements over who the process should include, and ongoing distrust of Myanmar's semi-civilian government and its still-powerful military.

National Reconciliation after 1988
Government troops heavily used four cuts counter-insurgency tactics in ethnic areas in the 1990s. Most ethnic groups became armed after the first military coup in 1962 and successive military governments used four cuts counter insurgency policy in ethnic areas. This policy involved: the cut off communications among rebel armed groups as well as local people; the cut off of information among people; the cut off of trade route in designated territories; searches and the destruction of any possible supplies to cut off these areas.  On the other hand, the military government forced ethnic groups to sign ceasefire agreements with ethnic rebels groups, while government troops were trying to root out their main bases in 1990s. In meanwhile, ethnic minorities’ political parties which won seats in 1990 elections, and formed the second largest pro-democracy block after NLD, were severely oppressed in cities. By the end of the century, there were twenty armed opposition groups had cease fire agreements with governments. However, the government did not hold political discussions with these groups or winning political parties. Therefore, some ethnic groups continued their armed struggle against the government. The ethnic populations suffered the most the result of long-standing hostilities with the central government. They have been treated as enemies of the state and second class citizens

Agreements
The signed ceasefire agreements have been nothing more than temporary military truces to suspend fighting and preserve the status quo, allowing the rebel groups to retain administrative control of their territories. Weaker or splinter rebel groups typically forfeit their territories to the government. Most agreements simply stipulated that the groups would be allowed to retain their arms and territories until the promulgation of a new constitution.

As part of the ceasefires, the government began the Border Area Development Programme in 1989, which became a ministry-level body in 1992, as the Ministry for the Progress of Border Areas and National Races and has built road infrastructure, schools, and hospitals in rebel-occupied territories.

On 31 March 2015, Burmese President Thein Sein signed a nationwide ceasefire draft along with many ethnic leaders and government officials.

Border Guard Forces

In April 2009, Lieutenant General Ye Myint led a government entourage to meet with Kokang, Shan and Wa insurgent groups, to discuss plans to create "collective security" formed by them and under the command of the Tatmadaw, which would eventually lead to the creation of the Border Guard Forces. In 2009, four of the insurgent groups, the Democratic Karen Buddhist Army, the Kachin Defence Army (4th Brigade of the KIA), the New Democratic Army - Kachin (NDA-K), and the Pa-O National Organisation/Army (PNO/A), accepted the transition plan's terms and transformed into BGF groups.

List of ceasefires
Since 1989, the Burmese government has signed the following ceasefire agreements

See also
 Union Peace Conference - 21st Century Panglong

References

Myanmar
History of Myanmar (1948–present)
Internal conflict in Myanmar
Politics of Myanmar
Wars involving Myanmar